is a Japanese actress and former singer.

Biography
Nakamura's father was a third-generation Japanese man and her mother was Korean and held citizenship in both South Korea and Japan. Nakamura, like many other multiracial Asians, had two names: her Japanese name Yuri Sei, and her Korean name Woo-ri Song.

She passed the singing audition of Asayan in 1996. She later formed the music duo YuriMari with her friend Mari Izawa, and made her music debut in 1998 with the duo. In 1999 the duo broke up.

Later on Nakamura became an actress under the name Yuri Nakamura and acted often in films, television dramas and music videos.

In 2007 she appeared in Break Through!'''s sequel Pacchigi! Love & Peace as Kyonja; her performance in such became one of her more popular roles. In October 2008 Nakamura appeared in the company play 1945, which also contributed heavily to her popularity. Later in the year she won the Rookie Award of the 3rd Osaka Cinema Festival for her role in the film Pacchigi! Love & Peace.

Nakamura is good friends with actress and dancer Asuka Kitabayashi, and they privately travel together.

Filmography
Films

TV drama

Awards
3rd Osaka Cinema Festival Newcomer Award (Pacchigi! Love & Peace)
2007 National Imaging Actress Award (Pacchigi! Love & Peace'')

References

Notes

External links
 

Japanese stage actresses
Zainichi Korean people
Avex Group talents
Actresses from Osaka Prefecture
Musicians from Osaka Prefecture
People from Neyagawa, Osaka
1982 births
Living people
21st-century Japanese singers
21st-century Japanese women singers